Lady Gwangjuwon of the Wang clan was the eldest daughter of Wang-Gyu who became the 16th wife of Taejo of Goryeo. She was the oldest, among Lady Sogwangjuwon and Lady Hugwangjuwon. After Taejo's death, their father became the most powerful and influence man who tried to kill King Hyejong and placed his only grandson, Prince Gwangjuwon in the throne.

References

Year of birth unknown
Year of death unknown
Consorts of Taejo of Goryeo
People from Gwangju, Gyeonggi